Marcus Antonius Polemo II (Ancient Greek : Μάρκος Ἀντώνιος Πολέμων Πυθόδωρος) (died c. 69/72), dynast of Olba and king in Cilicia between 54-69/72. This character has sometimes been confused with his contemporary cousin and almost namesake Polemon II of Pontus.

Origin and reign
Marcus Antonius Polemo II was the eldest son of Marcus Antonius Polemo I. He succeeded him as “sovereign client” of Rome as “dynast” of Olba and king in Cilicia.

Marriage
Marcus Antonius Polemo II married Berenice in 54, daughter of Herod Agrippa I, for whom he agreed to be circumcised but who abandoned him shortly after.

Notes and references

General sources 
 Christian Settipani, Continuité gentilice et continuité familiale dans les familles sénatoriales romaines à l'époque impériale, Oxford, Linacre College, Unit for Prosopographical Research, coll. « Prosopographica et Genealogica / 2 », 2000, 597 p., Addenda III (janvier-décembre 2002).
 Maurice Sartre Le Haut-Empire romain. Les provinces de la Méditerranée orientale d'Auguste aux Sévères Point Histoire n° H220 Éditions du Seuil Paris 1997 .

Roman client rulers
1st-century monarchs in the Middle East